Grandjouan is a surname. Notable people with the surname include:

 Clairève Grandjouan (1929–1982), French-born American archaeologist, grand-daughter of Jules Grandjouan
  (1875–1968), French artist, journalist, activist and illustrator for L'Assiette au Beurre
 Fleur Ng'weno, née Grandjouan, naturalist, writer and editor, sister of Clairève Grandjouan and wife of Hilary Ng'weno, Kenyan historian and journalist